School District 44 North Vancouver is a school district in the Canadian province of British Columbia. The district is located immediately north of the city of Vancouver, across the Burrard Inlet. SD44 includes the municipalities of the City of North Vancouver and the District of North Vancouver.

Schools

Closed schools
 Balmoral Junior Secondary School - 1959-2009
 District Diagnostic Centre (“DC1”), a specialized education setting for severe learning disabled (SLD) children - 1994 - closed for financial reasons 
 Delbrook Senior Secondary School - 1957-1977 closed due to fire.
 Plymouth Elementary School - closed for financial reasons
 Ridgeway Annex
Keith Lynn Alternative Secondary School - demolished for new highway interchange
Fromme Elementary

See also
 List of school districts in British Columbia

References

External links

https://www.sd44.ca/Schools/Pages/default.aspx

North Vancouver (city)
North Vancouver (district municipality)
44
Educational institutions in Canada with year of establishment missing